Numerous rebellions against China's Qing dynasty took place between the mid-19th and early 20th centuries, prior to the abdication of the last Emperor of China, Puyi, in February 1912. The table below lists some of these uprisings and important related events.

Taiping Rebellion

Nian Rebellion

Miao Rebellion

Red Turban Rebellion

Da Cheng Rebellion

Panthay Rebellion

First Dungan Revolt

Summary

See also
 Anti-Qing sentiment
 Wuchang Uprising
 1911 Revolution

Notes

References

Bibliography
 
Sunday Morning Post (hard copy). Hong Kong. 9 October 2011.

 
19th century in China
19th-century rebellions
20th century in China